Shawn Lee may refer to:

Shawn Lee (actor) (born 1990), actor from  Singapore
Shawn Lee (musician) (born 1963), American musician 
Shawn Lee (American football) (1966–2011), American football defensive tackle

See also
Sean Lee (born 1986), American football linebacker